Senator Brower may refer to:

Greg Brower (born 1964), Nevada State Senate
John M. Brower (1845–1913), North Carolina State Senate